Gregory's Girl is a 1980 Scottish coming-of-age romantic comedy film written and directed by Bill Forsyth and starring John Gordon Sinclair, Dee Hepburn and Clare Grogan. The film is set in and around a state secondary school in the Abronhill district of Cumbernauld.

Gregory's Girl was ranked No. 30 in the British Film Institute's list of the top 100 British films of the 20th century, and No. 29 on Entertainment Weeklys 2015 list of the 50 best high school movies.

Plot
Gregory Underwood is an awkward teenager who plays on his school football team. They are not doing very well, so the coach holds a trial to find new players. Dorothy shows up and, despite the coach's sexist misgivings, proves to be a very good player. She subsequently takes Gregory's place as centre forward, and Gregory in turn replaces his friend Andy as goalkeeper.

Gregory is all for her making the team, as he finds her very attractive. However, he has to compete for her attention with all the other boys who share the same opinion. Gregory initially confides in his best friend Steve, the most mature of Gregory's circle of friends, and asks him for help in attracting Dorothy. Steve, however, is unable to assist him.

Acting on the advice of his precocious 10-year-old sister Madeleine, he awkwardly asks Dorothy out on a date. She accepts, but Dorothy's friend, Carol, shows up at the rendezvous instead and informs Gregory that something had come up; Dorothy would not be able to make it. He is disappointed, but Carol talks him into taking her to the chip shop.

When they arrive, she hands him off to another friend, Margo, and leaves. By then, Gregory is rather confused, but goes for a walk with the new girl. On their stroll, they encounter a waiting Susan, another of Dorothy's friends, and Margo leaves. Susan confesses that it was all arranged by her friends, including Dorothy. She explains, "It's just the way girls work. They help each other."

They go to the park and talk. At the date's end, Gregory is more than pleased with Susan, and the two kiss numerous times on his doorstep before calling it a night and arranging a second date. Madeleine, who had been watching from the window, quizzes him on his date and calls him a liar when he claims he did not kiss Susan.

Gregory's friends, Andy and Charlie, are even more inept with girls but see Gregory at various times with three apparent dates, and are envious of his new success. They try to hitchhike to Caracas, where Andy has heard the women greatly outnumber the men, but fail at that as well.

Cast

Production
Produced on a budget of £200,000 the film generated worldwide box office revenue of £25.8 million. Many of the young actors were members of the Glasgow Youth Theatre, and had appeared in Forsyth's earlier film That Sinking Feeling (1979), including Robert Buchanan, Billy Greenlees, and John Gordon Sinclair. After casting, Hepburn was given six weeks of intense football training at Partick Thistle F.C.

Filming of exterior scenes at Gregory's school took place at Abronhill High School. As the film had a small budget, the actors supplied many of their own clothes; Hepburn's white shorts were borrowed from her sister. A person in a penguin costume is seen at various points in the film for no apparent reason. Inside the suit was Christopher Higson, son of production supervisor Paddy Higson.

The film was re-dubbed with rather anglicised Scottish accents for the original American theatrical release. Both versions are available on the American DVD release from MGM Home Entertainment.

The film's cast reunited for the 30th anniversary of its release in 2010, and a clip from the film featuring Hepburn was part of the opening ceremony at the London 2012 Summer Olympics.

Release
The film was released on 23 April 1981. There was a charity premiere in Glasgow on 3 May 1981. It was released on DVD and Blu-ray on 5 May 2014.

Reception

Critical response
Film critic Roger Ebert liked the film's direction, and wrote "Bill Forsyth's Gregory's Girl is a charming, innocent, very funny little movie about the weird kid. ... The movie contains so much wisdom about being alive and teenage and vulnerable that maybe it would even be painful for a teenager to see it. ... Maybe only grown-ups should see this movie. You know, people who have gotten over the pains of unrequited love (hollow laugh)."

The staff at Variety liked the work of the young cast and Forsyth's direction, and wrote, "Filmmaker Bill Forsyth, whose friendly, unmalicious approach recalls that of René Clair, is concerned with young students (in particular, a soccer team goalie, Gregory) seeking out the opposite sex. ... As Gregory, John Gordon Sinclair is adept at physical comedy. Hepburn is properly enigmatic as the object of his desire, with ensemble approach giving Greg's precocious 10-year-old sister played by Allison Forster a key femme role."

Critic Richard Skorman wrote, "Forsyth does a good job of making light of the tender part in [Gregory's] teenage psyche, and his friends and little sister in particular are quirky and lovable. Unlike the film's American counterparts, Gregory's Girl is refreshingly free of mean-spirited characters and horny young studs bemoaning their virginity."

The review aggregator Rotten Tomatoes reported that 95% of critics gave the film a positive review, based on 20 reviews.

Reappraisal
In a retrospective appraisal of the film forty years after its release, Dr Jonny Murray, Senior Lecturer in Film and Visual Culture at Edinburgh College of Art, was quoted in The Scotsman as saying: "Gregory’s Girl is one of cinema’s true portrayals of the state of adolescence – a totally universal theme which only a few other filmmakers have been able to capture so brilliantly. Bill managed to capture not just what that looks like – but what that feels like."

Awards
Wins
 British Academy of Film and Television Arts (BAFTA): Award for Best Original Screenplay, Bill Forsyth, 1982
 London Critics Circle Film Awards: Special Achievement Award, Bill Forsyth, 1982
 Variety Club actress of the year award, Dee Hepburn, 1981
Nominations
 BAFTA Award for Best Newcomer, John Gordon Sinclair, 1981
 BAFTA Award for Best Direction, Bill Forsyth, 1982
 BAFTA Award for Best Film, Bill Forsyth, 1982

Sequel
Gregory's Two Girls was released in 1999, with Sinclair reprising the role of Gregory, who by then was a 35-year-old teacher in his former secondary school. Reviewing the film for The Guardian, Peter Bradshaw said: "This quaint film is from the stable of Forsyth movies such as That Sinking Feeling and Local Hero, and disconcertingly out of its time... all Forsyth's films have charm, including this one. But, unfortunately, Gregory's Two Girls has the unhappy distinction of being an Accidental Period Piece."

However, Time Out London's reviewer said "There's still comic mileage in Gordon-Sinclair's amiable fumbling Gregory... [A]ttention is directed towards wider, broadly political issues, but Forsyth's assured craftsmanship ensures that they are deftly woven into the storytelling. Gordon-Sinclair is a revelation, and although the film suffers from a lack of pace, its wealth of human insight and the premium it places on subtlety of expression make it a rare pleasure.

See also
 BFI Top 100 British films

References

External links
 
 
 
 
 
 Gregory's Girl trailer at YouTube

1980s coming-of-age comedy films
1980s high school films
1981 romantic comedy films
1980s teen comedy films
1980s teen romance films
Films about puberty
1980s English-language films
English-language Scottish films
Films set in Scotland
Films whose writer won the Best Screenplay BAFTA Award
Films directed by Bill Forsyth
ITC Entertainment films
Scottish comedy films
Scottish films
Cumbernauld
1980s British films